The Teatro Manuel Ascencio Segura is a theatre and concert hall in Lima, Peru.  First built in 1615, it is considered the oldest theatre in Latin America.

History
In 1615 an open-air theater (Corral de Comedias) was built on the same spot where the Teatro Segura is located.  This original open-air theater was destroyed by an earthquake on 1746 and rebuilt a year later.  The theater was later reformed on 1822 and 1874.  The actual construction was built in 1909 under the name of "Teatro Municipal". The name was changed in 1929 to "Teatro Manuel Ascencio Segura", after the Teatro Municipal de Lima was bought by the Municipality of Lima.

References

External links
 -- Official website: all about Teatro Segura  Retrieved 4 January 2013

Theatres in Peru
Buildings and structures in Lima
Tourist attractions in Lima
Cultural heritage of Peru